Susah may refer to:

Susa, Libya
Sousse, Tunisia
Al-Susah, Syria